Eurotettix is genus of grasshoppers in the family Acrididae.  The distribution of Eurotettix species is limited to  South America.

Species include:
Eurotettix femoratus
Eurotettix minor
Eurotettix robustus
Eurotettix schrottkyi
Eurotettix lilloanus
 Eurotettix monnei
Eurotettix carbonelli
 Eurotettix raphaelandrearum
Eurotettix montanus
Eurotettix concavus
Eurotettix latus
Eurotettix procerus
Eurotettix brevicerci
Eurotettix similraphael
Eurotettix bugresensis

References

Acrididae genera
Melanoplinae